Robert Peters (born Robert Michael Parkins; 1918–2005, Kettering General Hospital) was a de-frocked minister, a plagiarist, a conman, and a bigamist who married at least eight women. He was dubbed "the Romeo Rev" by the popular press. In 2019 he was the subject of a biography by Adam Sisman titled The Professor and the Parson: A Story of Desire, Deceit and Defrocking (Profile Books).

References 

1918 births
2005 deaths
People from Carlisle, Cumbria
English fraudsters
British fraudsters
Clergy from Cumbria
Impostors
People with narcissistic personality disorder
Bigamists
20th-century English businesspeople